Den Norske Klub (The Norwegian Club) is a social club based in London. It was founded on 17 May 1887. Its members are Norwegians living in London or Britons with a connection to or interest in Norway. It is the oldest club of its kind in the UK and is still an important meeting place for the Norwegian community in London.

As a result of DNK's long existence and extensive networks, DNK attracts high caliber speakers and guests to its events including royals, celebrities, business leaders, and members of parliament.

History

The early years 

The Klub owes its existence to a dozen young Norwegians who were celebrating their national day in a bar in 1887. When, at closing time, they were told they could stay only if they were representing a private club, one of the participants had the presence of mind to declare, “Well, we represent the Norwegian Club in London.” They jotted down some articles of association on a piece of paper, which they all signed, and that allowed them to carry on drinking — Den Norske Klub was born.

The first meetings took place every Thursday evening in a pub and the membership fee was fixed at 1 shilling per month. Most of the members were men in their 20s who had come to London to study or to train as businessmen, particularly in shipping, and only stayed in London a few years. The resident Norwegian colony, including the older gentlemen, were at first sceptical to the Klub but became involved after about 1900. In these early years, membership varied between 20-odd and about 50 members. Today it is around 300.

Women were originally only admitted as guests at Klub dinners and balls, but gained the right to become members in 1982.

The Second World War 1939-1945 

For the first few decades, the Klub held its meetings and dances at hotels, inns, and pubs in central locations around London. This changed in 1924, when DNK moved to ‘Norway House’ off Trafalgar Square, occupying the top three floors. This building in Cockspur Street came to play an important role during World War II, when many Norwegian institutions and government bodies were housed there. King Haakon VII and the members of his Norwegian government-in-exile became regular visitors to the Klub.

Royal patronage 

King Haakon VII became DNK's first patron. His son, King Olav V, was honorary president from 1957 until his death in 1991. The present King, Harald V, and his daughter, H. H. Princess Märtha Louise, are honorary members today.

Today
In 1997, ‘Norway House’ was sold and, after a couple of years sharing the premises of the Danish Club, moved to the Naval & Military Club, also known as The In & Out, in 2000.

The club premises are in St James's Square, between Piccadilly and Pall Mall, where it shares a building with and has a close cooperation with The Naval and Military Club (The ‘In & Out') in the heart of London's club land at 4 St. James's Square.

External links
 DNK website

Gentlemen's clubs in London
1887 establishments in the United Kingdom
Organizations established in 1887
St James's
Norway–United Kingdom relations
1887 in London